Joseph S. Wineke (born January 5, 1957) is an American politician. He was chairman of the Democratic Party of Wisconsin from 2005 through 2009.  During his term as chair, he saw the Democrats gain full control of Wisconsin's executive and legislative branches for the first time since 1986.  Before becoming party chair, he served ten years in the Wisconsin State Assembly and six years in the Wisconsin State Senate, representing suburban areas of Dane, Green, and Rock counties.

Early life and career
Wineke graduated from Verona Area High School in 1975. He graduated with a B.A. in political science from the University of Wisconsin-Madison in 1980. He served on the Verona City Council from 1980 to 1983. He was elected to the Wisconsin State Assembly and served from 1983 to 1993, when he was elected to the Wisconsin State Senate in the April 1993 special election. Wineke was reelected in 1994.

Political career
In 1998, Wineke ran for the open seat being vacated by United States Representative Scott Klug in the U.S. House of Representatives. He was defeated in the Democratic primary, receiving 27 percent of the vote. Tammy Baldwin won both the primary and general election.

Wineke was elected the chairperson of the Democratic Party of Wisconsin in 2005. He served the limit of two terms, and was succeeded by Mike Tate, who was elected in June 2009. He went on to serve as the Executive Director of the Construction Labor-Management Council of Greater Wisconsin Inc. The Council was created in 1990 as a joint effort between building trades unions and contractors to promote a better construction industry. Wineke currently serves as the Administrator of the State of Wisconsin Division of Compensation and Labor Relations.

Personal life
Wineke was born in Madison and raised in Verona, Wisconsin. He and his wife, Debora, have three children, Scott, Brian, and Jessica.

References

External links 

 Fighting Bob Interview with Joe Wineke

1957 births
Living people
Politicians from Madison, Wisconsin
Democratic Party of Wisconsin chairs
University of Wisconsin–Madison alumni
Wisconsin city council members
Democratic Party Wisconsin state senators
Democratic Party members of the Wisconsin State Assembly
2008 United States presidential electors
People from Verona, Wisconsin